Tobias Sammet (born 21 November 1977) is a German musician, singer, songwriter, music producer and radio host best known for being the singer and primary songwriter of the power metal band Edguy, and the founder of the metal opera project Avantasia.

Career
Sammet founded Edguy in 1992 with schoolmates. Under the musical influence of AC/DC, Freddie Mercury (Queen), and Helloween, the typical power metal sound of his band, in which he mainly acts as a singer and frontman, emerged.

After several tours and chart placements with Edguy, Sammet founded his all-star project Avantasia and released a metal opera under this name. Initially planned as a once-in-a-lifetime studio project, he launched Avantasia again in 2006 and since then he regularly produced concept albums and rock operas. When he was offered the evening program of the main stage with Avantasia at the Wacken Open Air in 2008, he decided to put his side project on stage. Since then, he has regularly toured North and South America, Asia and Europe with Edguy and Avantasia.

He made guest appearances on Rob Rock's album Holy Hell, on the metal opera Aina, and on Revolution Renaissance's New Era album, besides others.

In 2011, readers of the Japanese Burrn Magazine ranked him best songwriter after he had released the two albums The Wicked Symphony and Angel of Babylon simultaneously. The albums featured guest appearances by Klaus Meine, Eric Singer, Jon Oliva and Michael Kiske and contained 21 songs that had been solely written by Tobias.

During a headliner show of the band Edguy at the Bang Your Head Festival in 2012, Sammet fell off the stage and broke his nose and several ribs. Despite these injuries, he sang the entire set of the concert before being treated in hospital.

Tobias Sammet sold more than three million records, played 12 world tours in more than 40 countries, had numerous chart placements and played concerts at all major festivals (including 10 shows at Wacken Open Air).

Discography

Edguy

Savage Poetry (1995)
Kingdom of Madness (1997)
Vain Glory Opera (1998)
Theater of Salvation (1999)
The Savage Poetry (2000)
Mandrake (2001)
Burning Down The Opera (2003)
Hall of Flames – compilation (2004)
Hellfire Club (2004)
Rocket Ride (2006)
Tinnitus Sanctus (2008)
Fucking with Fire: Live (2009)
Age of the Joker (2011)
Space Police: Defenders of the Crown (2014)
Monuments – compilation (2017)

Avantasia

 Avantasia – Single – (2000)
 The Metal Opera (2001)
 The Metal Opera Part II (2002)
Lost in Space Part 1 (2007)
Lost in Space Part 2 (2007)
 The Scarecrow (2008)
 The Wicked Symphony (2010)
 Angel of Babylon (2010)
 The Flying Opera (2011)
 The Mystery of Time (2013)
 Mystery of a Blood Red Rose – Single – (2015)
 Ghostlights (2016)
 Moonglow (2019)
 A Paranormal Evening with the Moonflower Society (2022)

Other appearances
 Rhapsody of Fire – Rain of a Thousand Flames – 2001
 Shaaman – Ritual – "Pride" – 2002
 Freedom Call – Eternity – 2002
 Aina – Days of Rising Doom – "Flight of Torek" – 2003
 Rob Rock – Holy Hell – "Move On" – 2005
 Ayreon – Elected – "Elected" – 2008
 Revolution Renaissance – New Era – 2008
 Oliver Hartmann – 3 – "Brothers" – 2009
 Bruce Kulick – BK3 – "I'm the Animal" – 2010
 H.E.A.T – Freedom Rock – "Black Night" – 2010
 Hansen & Friends – XXX : 30 Years of Metal – "Making Headlines", "Stranger in Time" – 2016
 Ayreon – The Source – as The Captain – 2017
 Magnum – Lost on the Road to Eternity – "Lost on the Road to Eternity" – 2018

References

External links

 
 Edguy's official website
 

1977 births
German heavy metal musicians
German heavy metal singers
English-language singers from Germany
Living people
People from Fulda
21st-century German male singers
Edguy members